Patara is a village located in Jalandhar district in the state of Punjab in north India.

Location 
The village is located off the Jalandhar-Hoshiarpur Road and is about 8-9 kilometres from the Jalandhar city centre. Hoshiarpur is about 40 km from Patara. The Jalandhar Cantonment is about 5 km from Patara.

History
Patara Village was founded by a wrestler by the name of Dullo, a Jatt Landlord belonging to Khunkhun Clan, nearly 500 years ago. Dullo Jatt, mothers village was Kangniwal near Jalandhar.

Nihala and Ruldu were the descendents of Dullo Jatt. the Khunkhun Jatt families of Patara maintain the suffix of the two names, Nihala Ke descendents of Nihala and Ruldu Ke descendents of Ruldu.

Area information 

Patara has a police station, a commercial centre, a nationalized Bank (Bank of India), a cooperative bank, a sub-Post Office (Indian Postal Service Pin Code 144101) and Verka milk producers society and milk bar for various milk products various shops and service providers. There is a small gurudwara at the end of the road:  Gurdwara Peeplan Wala Sahib. There is also a Shiva temple right across the gurdwara. There is separate boys and girls school in village. There is also library in the village. On Patara road just before there is newly opened petrol pump between Hosiharpur-Jalandhar road and Bolina doaba railway station.

The streets are fairly narrow and suitable for single-lane driving only. The land around the village is flat and fertile.

Much of the development of the village was carried out under the leadership of Om Parkash who was unanimously elected Sarpanch for 3 consecutive terms of 4 years each.

References 

Villages in Jalandhar district